The United Nations Educational, Scientific and Cultural Organization (UNESCO) World Heritage Sites are places of importance to cultural or natural heritage as described in the UNESCO World Heritage Convention, established in 1972. West Germany ratified the convention on 23 August 1976; and East Germany on 12 December 1988, making their historical sites eligible for inclusion on the list.

As of 2021, there are 51 official UNESCO World Heritage Sites in Germany, including 48 cultural sites, 3 natural sites. In addition, there are 7 sites on Germany's tentative list and 17 German entries in the Memory of the World Programme. The first site in Germany to be inscribed on the World Heritage List was Aachen Cathedral in 1978, which was also one of the first sites in the world to be added to the list. Germany holds the third-highest number of World Heritage Sites in the World, after Italy with 58 sites and China with 56 sites.

Dresden Elbe Valley, which was designated a World Heritage in Danger in July 2006, was finally delisted in June 2009, making it one of the only three sites in the world that have been removed from the World Heritage Site register.

Location of sites

Map

World Heritage Sites in Germany 
UNESCO lists sites under ten criteria; each entry must meet at least one of the criteria. Criteria i through vi are cultural, and vii through x are natural.

Tentative list 

The tentative list consists of sites previously nominated, but not yet inscribed.

Former site 
One site has been struck from the list.

See also 
Tourism in Germany
List of national parks in Germany
Kulturdenkmal
Deutsche Stiftung Denkmalschutz

References

External links 
German Commission of UNESCO
UNESCO volunteer organisation of Germany
Wonders of World Heritage – A DW Guide to all German sites (8 different routes)
360 panorama views of all German World Heritage Sites

World Heritage Sites in Germany
 
Germany
World Heritage Sites
World Heritage Sites